Paraleucopis is a genus of flies in the family Chamaemyiidae.

Species
P. boydensis Steyskal, 1972
P. corvina Malloch, 1913
P. mexicana Steyskal, 1981

References

Chamaemyiidae
Lauxanioidea genera